Dinner with the Family is a 1959 Australian TV play. Australian TV drama was relatively rare at the time. It featured English star Jessie Matthews in her first Australian TV appearance - she was touring the country at the time - and was shot in Melbourne.

Plot
A young man, Georges, married for money and is unhappy because he has fallen in love with Isabelle. To escape from reality one night he hires actors to play his parents and a butler and invites over Isabelle. But George's parents are determined to save their son's marriage and turn up with George's worthless friend Jacques. Barbara is Jacques' wife.

Cast
Tony Brown as Georges
Joy Mitchell as Isabelle
Alan Tobin as Jacques 
Jessie Matthews as Madam de Montrachet
Paul Bacon as Delmonte	
June Brunelle as Barbara, wife of Georges' friend
Marcia Hart 		
Laurie Lange

Production
The play had recently been performed in Little Theatre in Melbourne starring Sheila Florence. It was announced in July 1959 that the ABC would film it with Jessie Matthews playing Florence's role. Star June Brunell had recently returned from England where she appeared in The Flying Doctors TV series.

Reception
The Sydney Morning Herald called it "a brave, but not really successful attempt to bridge the gap between quintessential theatre on the one hand, and the television screen on the other... Christopher Muir's production was precise, well-planned, and often Imaginative."

The Age TV critic said "it was not the sort of play to set the Yarra on fire" but felt it was strong in the scenes in which Matthews appeared, although her role was relatively small.

See also
List of live television plays broadcast on Australian Broadcasting Corporation (1950s)

References

External links

Dinner with the Family at National Film and Sound Archive

1950s Australian television plays
1959 television plays
Films based on works by Jean Anouilh
Films directed by Christopher Muir